Roberto Yuta Galarreta Villar  (born 10 December 1997) is a Peruvian judoka. He won one of the bronze medals in the men's 90 kg event at the 2019 Pan American Games held in Lima, Peru. In his bronze medal match he defeated Rafael Macedo of Brazil.

Achievements

References

External links 
 

Living people
1997 births
Place of birth missing (living people)
Peruvian male judoka
Pan American Games medalists in judo
Pan American Games bronze medalists for Peru
Medalists at the 2019 Pan American Games
Judoka at the 2019 Pan American Games
South American Games gold medalists for Peru
South American Games medalists in judo
Competitors at the 2018 South American Games
21st-century Peruvian people